Kale My Name is a 100% plant-based vegan restaurant founded in 2020 by Nemanja Golubovic. It was first opened in Chicago, Illinois. After a year, a franchise in Los Angeles, California was opened, which was co-owned by Tabitha Brown, an actress, author, and social media personality.

Background 
Kale My Name is a restaurant chain popular for its 100% plant-based food products. The owner, Nemanja Golubovic, adopted a brand mantra “vegan for the animals, for our health, and the earth.” His goal is to promote good health to his customers and keep a healthy planet by providing delicious plant-based food options for everyone. 

This vegan restaurant opened as take-out and delivery during the pandemic. On its first weekend, Kale My Name was able to sell 500 to-go bags which were expected to last within three months. Later, it was transitioned into a dine-in restaurant. Being patronized and supported in Chicago, it ended up expanding to Los Angeles, California. 

The actress, Tabitha Brown, is a regular customer of the Kale My Name – Chicago branch. Being impressed and fascinated with the taste of the vegan food in Kale My Name, she became Nemanja’s friend. She was encouraged to open a branch of Kale My Name in Los Angeles, wherein they became business partners. 

It was recognized as a top vegan restaurant in North Chicago by Top-Rated.online. The restaurant received several five-star reviews on Yelp, Google, Facebook, and GrubHub.

Products 
Kale My Name is popular for serving ajvar and pita bread, traditional balkan spread, empanadas, cauliflower wings, chips and fresh guacamole, tequeños, nachos, mac balls, homemade fries, Greek fries, sliders, and fried oyster mushrooms. It also serves a variety of healthy drinks, soups, salads, wraps, pasta, burgers, and tacos.

Awards 

 Restaurant Guru 2023 – Best Vegetarian Restaurant in Chicago 

 2022 Best Business Winner – Best Social Media 
 Diners’ Choice Award 2022 Winner, by OpenTable 
 Veggie Award 2022 Winner – Best Vegan Casual Restaurant in the Country, by VegNews Magazine 
 Best Social Media Accounts 2021 and 2022, by North Commission – Chicago 
 Best Patio 2020, by North Commission 
 Best Chicago Award Winner – Best Vegan Restaurant, by Chicago Reader 
 Best Brunch Winner in Chicago, by VegOut Magazine 
 Second Best Brunch Winner in America, by VegOut Magazine 
 Best Soup of Chicago – nominated

References

External links 

 Official website

Vegan restaurants in the United States
Restaurants in Chicago
Restaurants established in 2020